Adam Hieronim Sieniawski was the name of two Polish–Lithuanian nobles:

 Adam Hieronim Sieniawski (1576–1616), starost of Jaworów
 Adam Hieronim Sieniawski (1623/1624–1650), starost of Lwów